The Jean-Bart was a French automobile manufactured from 1907 until 1907.  Successor to the Prosper-Lambert, the company built shaft-driven cars, single-cylinders of 9 hp and fours of 16 hp and 40 hp.

References

Defunct motor vehicle manufacturers of France